Ruma Guha Thakurta (21 November 1934 – 3 June 2019) was an Indian actress and singer primarily associated with Bengali language films. She founded Calcutta Youth Choir in 1958.

Early life 
Ruma Guha Thakurta was born on 21 November 1934 to Satyen Ghosh (Monty Ghosh) and singer Sati Devi. Her family was culturally inclined to Brahmo Samaj, a societal component of Brahmoism. Sati was a trained vocalist and a niece of Bijoya Ray, the wife of Satyajit Ray. Ruma Guha Thakurta began as a dancer. Later, she went to Almora Academy of Uday Shankar at Lahore to study dance. She started training in music at Swarabitan in Kolkata, which had been established by her parents. In later years, she studied under Abdul Rehman Khan of Patiala gharana, the Ustad of Nirmla Devi and Lakshmi Shankar in Bombay.

She married Kishore Kumar in 1951 and had a son Amit Kumar by this marriage. The couple divorced in 1958 and she married Arup Guha Thakurta in 1960. The couple had two children, Ayan and Sromona. Sromona is also a singer.

Career 
Guha Thakurta  made her acting debut in Amiya Chakravarty's Jwar Bhata (1944) at age ten. This was the debut film of Dilip Kumar. Her next film as Ruma Ghosh was Nitin Bose, whose first cousin was her aunt's father-in-law,'s Mashaal (1950) in Hindi, which had a Bengali version called Samar, adapted from Bankim Chandra Chattopadhyay's novel Rajani. She portrayed a blind girl, Sarla.

After her divorce, Ruma moved to Calcutta to act in Rajen Tarafdar’s Ganga based on Samaresh Bose’s eponymous cult novel. She acted as one of two leading ladies, with Sandhya Roy. Ganga won the National award for Best Feature Film that year and Ruma's portrayal of Himi received critical acclamation. In the same year, she acted in Personal Assistant opposite to Bhanu Bandopadhayay and in Khaniker Atithi by Tapan Sinha.

Her film career revived in 1962 with Benarasi, produced by her and directed by her husband. It was the tale of a courtesan who tries to lead a life of dignity and respect, when her childhood sweetheart, Ratan, takes her away from her terrible environment. It flopped, but won the BFJA Award for Best Feature Film the following year.

Filmography

As an actress

As a playback singer

Awards 
 BFJA Awards (1964) for Best Actress in supporting role – Palatak
 IFFI Best Actor Award (Female) (1965) for "Nirjan Saikate" at 3rd IFFI

See also
List of notable Calcuttans

References

External links
 
 

2019 deaths
Bengali actresses
Actresses in Bengali cinema
Bengali singers
Brahmos
People associated with Santiniketan
Indian film actresses
Actresses from Kolkata
20th-century Indian actresses
20th-century Indian singers
21st-century Indian women singers
Women musicians from West Bengal
Actresses in Hindi cinema
Indian women playback singers
Bengali playback singers
Singers from Kolkata
20th-century Indian women singers
21st-century Indian singers
21st-century Indian actresses
1934 births